Brack is an English and German surname. Notable people with the surname include:

Antonio Brack Egg (born 1940), Peruvian agronomist engineer, an ecologist, and researcher
Bill Brack (born 1935), former racing driver
Brack Cornett (outlaw) (1841-1888), prominent outlaw born in Goliad County, Texas
Gibby Brack (born 1908), Major League Baseball outfielder
John Brack (1920–1999), Australian painter
Kenny Bräck (born 1966), race car driver from Sweden
Robert C. Brack (b. 1953), American judge
Viktor Brack (1904–1948), Nazi physician and organiser of the Euthanasia Programme; executed for war crimes
Walter Brack (1880–1919), German backstroke and breaststroke swimmer
William Jackson Brack (1837–1901), first mayor of Orlando, Florida

See also
Bracks

German-language surnames
English-language surnames